Trompeteros District is one of five districts of the province Loreto in Peru.

References

Districts of the Loreto Province
Districts of the Loreto Region